The Order of Canons Regular of Prémontré, also known as the Premonstratensians, the Norbertines and, in Britain and Ireland, as the White Canons (from the colour of their habit), is a religious order of canons regular of the Catholic Church founded in Prémontré near Laon in 1120 by Norbert of Xanten, who later became Archbishop of Magdeburg. Premonstratensians are designated by OPraem (Ordo Praemonstratensis) following their name.

Norbert was a friend of Bernard of Clairvaux and was largely influenced by the Cistercian ideals as to both the manner of life and the government of his order. As the Premonstratensians are not monks but canons regular, their work often involves preaching and the exercising of pastoral ministry; they frequently serve in parishes close to their abbeys or priories.

History
The order was founded in 1120. Saint Norbert had made various efforts to introduce a strict form of canonical life in various communities of canons in Germany; in 1120 he was working in the now-extinct Ancient Diocese of Laon, in Picardy, northeastern France. There, in a rural place called Prémontré, he and thirteen companions established a monastery to be the cradle of a new order. As they were canons regular, they followed the Rule of St. Augustine, but with supplementary statutes that made their life one of great austerity. Common prayer and celebration of the Eucharist was to be the sustaining dynamic of the community.

In 1126, when the order received papal approbation by Pope Honorius II, there were nine houses; others were established in quick succession throughout western Europe, so that at the middle of the fourteenth century there were some 1,300 monasteries for men and 400 for women. The Norbertines played a predominant part in the conversion of the Wends and the bringing of Christianity to the territories around the Elbe and the Oder. In time, mitigations and relaxations emerged, and these gave rise to reforms and semi-independent congregations within the Order.

The Norbertines arrived in England about 1143, first at Newhouse in Lincoln, England; before the dissolution under Henry VIII there were 35 houses. Soon after their arrival in England, they founded Dryburgh Abbey in the Borders area of Scotland, which was followed by other communities at Whithorn Priory, Dercongal Abbey and Tongland Abbey all in the Borders area, as well as Fearn Abbey in the northern part of the nation. Like most orders they were almost completely devastated by the successive onslaughts of the Reformation, French Revolution, and Napoleon, but then experienced a revival in the 19th century.

By the beginning of the nineteenth century the order had become almost extinct, only eight houses surviving, all in the Habsburg monarchy. However, there was something of a resurgence, and at the start of the twentieth century there were 20 monasteries and 1000 priests. , the number of monasteries had increased to nearly 100 and spread to every continent. In 1893, Father Bernard Pennings and two other Norbertines from Berne Abbey arrived in the United States of America to minister to Belgian immigrants in northern Wisconsin. De Pere, Wisconsin became the site of the first Norbertine Abbey in the new world.

By their nature as canons regular the Premonstratensians have always engaged in pastoral work of various kinds, including what would now be called retreat centres (nearly everywhere), and care for pilgrims (as at Conques) and, like many religious houses, have often run schools on a variety of scales (Averbode Abbey, Berne Abbey, United States, Australia). In order to support themselves, the different communities have down the centuries, and in modern times, operated small-scale manual activities (SME) such as printing (Averbode Abbey, Tongerlo Abbey, Berne Abbey), farming (Kinshasa, Ireland, Postel Abbey), forestry (Schlägl Abbey, Geras Abbey, Slovakia), and cheese-making (Postel Abbey). They have also entered agreements with breweries (Tongerlo Abbey, Postel Abbey, Park Abbey, Leffe, Grimbergen) and undertaken artistic bookbinding (in Oosterhout). Other activities have included the running of an astronomical observatory (Mira, Grimbergen).

In 2015 there were some 1000 male and 200 female members of the Order.

The Feast of All Norbertine Saints and Blesseds is celebrated internally on November 13.

The Norbertines have also had a major presence in the area of Green Bay, Wisconsin, owning WBAY television and radio stations until the mid-1970s. The Nobertines ran two local boys high schools until 1990 and still run four local schools in De Pere and Green Bay. Among these schools is St. Norbert College, the only Norbertine higher education institution in the world.

Canonesses

The Order has several abbeys of women who, though technically called canonesses, follow the life of an enclosed religious order and are therefore more commonly termed Norbertine nuns. Like the Norbertine communities for men, those for women are autonomous. Unusually, within the religious communities of the Catholic Church, the Norbertine Order has always seen the spiritual life of the canonesses as being on an equal footing with that of its priests and lay brothers. In the Middle Ages, the Premonstratensians even had a few double monasteries, where men and women lived in cloisters located next to each other as part of the same abbey, the communities demonstrating their unity by sharing the church building. Today, it is common for a foundation of canonesses to have links not only with other canonesses, but also with a community of canons.

Premonstratensian Rite
The Premonstratensians were among the religious orders with their own rite who kept this rite after Pope Pius V suppressed such rites with a continuous tradition of less than two hundred years. The Premonstratensian Rite was especially characterized by a ritual solemnity. The Premonstratensian Rite was also characterized by an emphasis on the Paschal mystery unique among the Latin rites. This was especially seen in the solemnity with which the daily conventional High Mass and office was celebrated during the Easter octave, especially vespers which concluded with a procession to the baptismal font, a practice paralleled among the Latin rites only in similar processions still found in the Ambrosian Rite. Another unique practice of the Premonstratensian Rite was the celebration of a daily votive Mass in honor of the Virgin Mary in each of its abbeys and priories.

Structure
Since Norbertine abbeys (and most priories) are autonomous, practices and apostolates are different, depending on the needs of the local Church. Some houses are contemplative in character whilst others are highly active in pastoral ministry. However, each is guided by the Rule of Saint Augustine and the Constitutions established by the General Chapter, which is held every six years.

The general Chapter includes representatives from both male and female communities. The head of the Order, termed Abbot General, resides in Rome, and he is assisted in his duties by the Definitors (High Council) as well as commissions established for various aspects of the Order's life such as liturgy and inter-abbey communications.

Abbeys

As of 2012, there were Premonstratensian abbeys or priories throughout the world: Australia, Austria, Belgium, Brazil, Canada, Czech Republic, Democratic Republic of the Congo, Denmark, France, Germany, Hungary, India, Ireland, Italy, Netherlands, Peru, Poland, Romania, Russia, Slovakia, South Africa, Spain, Switzerland, United Kingdom, and the USA.

There are seven circaries (Premonstratensian term for an ecclesiastical province):

Anglica Circary
St Norbert Priory, Queens Park, Perth, Australia
St. Philip's Priory, Chelmsford, England
Holy Trinity Abbey, Kilnacrott, Ireland
St. Norbert Abbey, De Pere, Wisconsin
 Holy Spirit House of Studies, Chicago
Daylesford Abbey, Paoli, Pennsylvania, USA
 Immaculate Conception Priory, Middletown, Delaware, USA 
St. Michael's Abbey, California, USA
St. Moses the Black, Jackson, Mississippi, USA
Santa Maria de la Vid Abbey, New Mexico, USA
 St.Norbert Abbey, Jamtara, Jabalpur (M.P), India
St. Norbert Priory, Indara, India
St. Norbert Priory, Mumbai, India
St. Norbert Study House, Nagpur, India
Norbertine Study House, Pune, India
 Quasi-Cannonry of Kerala, India 
 Cannonry of Manathawady, India
St. Norbert's Priory, Cape Town, South Africa
 St. Norbert Priory, Tamil Nadu, India
Bohemica Circary
 Nová Říše Monastery, Czech Republic
Strahov Monastery, Czech Republic
Canonry in Holíč Slovakia
Teplá Abbey, Czech Republic
 Želiv Abbey, Czech Republic
Jasov Monastery, Slovakia
Brabantica Circary
Averbode Abbey, Belgium
Vejle, Denmark
Brasschaat Priory, Belgium
Grimbergen Abbey, Belgium
Park Abbey, Belgium
Postel Abbey, Belgium
Tongerlo Abbey, Belgium
Parroquia San Pablo, Chiguayante, Chile
Berne Abbey, The Netherlands
Priory of Essenburgh, Hierden
Priory ‘De Schans’, Tilburg

Gallica Circary
Priory La Cambre, Brussels
Abbaye Notre-Dame de Leffe, Dinant
 St. Joseph's Priory, Saint-Constant, Canada
Abbey of St. Michael, Frigolet, France
Abbey of St. Martin, Mondaye, France
Priory of St. Foy, Conques, France
Prieuré Notre-Dame des Neiges, Laloubère, France
La Lucerne Abbey
 Priory of Our Lady of the Assumption, Kinshasa, Democratic Republic of Congo
Germanica Circary
Hamborn Abbey, North Rhine-Westphalia, Germany
Premomonstratensian Priory in Magdeburg
Speinshart Abbey, Bavaria
Windberg Abbey, Bavaria
Roggenburg Abbey, Bavaria
Stift Geras, Austria
Stift Schlägl, Austria
Stift Wilten, Tyrol
Hungarica Circary
 Abbey of St. Michael the Archangel, Csorna, Hungary
 Gödöllő Canonry, Gödöllő, Hungary
 Saint Stephen Abbey, Oradea, Romania
Portuguesa Circary
Priory of St. Norbert, Itinga, Brazil
Priory of Natal
Pfarre Gatterhölzl, Vienna, Austria
 St Norbert Abbey, Jaú, Brazil
Parish of São Paulo
 Montes Claros Priory
 Mirabela, priory parish
 Casa de Contagem

Discontinued

Stift Griffen, Carinthia
Stift Pernegg, Lower Austria
Bonne-Espérance Abbey, Belgium
Cornillon Abbey, Belgium
Floreffe Abbey, Belgium
Furnes (Veurne) Abbey
 Leffe Abbey
Ninove Abbey, Belgium
Bellapais Abbey, Cyprus
Hradisko Monastery, Czech Republic
Børglum Abbey, Denmark
Monastery of Bäckaskog, Skåne, 12th-century Denmark
Monastery of Övedskloster, Skåne, 12th-century Denmark
Monastery of Tommarp, Skåne, 12th-century Denmark
Monastery of Vä, Skåne, 12th-century Denmark
Ardenne Abbey, France
L'Étanche Abbey, Lorraine, France
Abbey of St John the Baptist, Falaise, France
Cuissy Abbey, France
Abbey of St. Martin, Laon, France
Prémontré Abbey, France
Pont-à-Mousson Abbey
All Saints' Abbey, Germany
 , North Rhine-Westphalia, Germany
Lorsch Abbey, Germany
Obermarchtal Abbey, Germany
Pöhlde Abbey, Germany
Schussenried Abbey, Germany
Steingaden Abbey, Germany
Rot an der Rot Abbey, Germany
Weissenau Abbey, Germany

Zsámbék Abbey, Hungary
Holy Trinity Abbey, Lough Key, Ireland
Kildermot Abbey, Ireland
St. Antimo's Abbey, Italy
St. Olav's Abbey, Tønsberg, Norway
Monastery of Dragsmark, Bohuslän, 13th century Norway
Żukowo - Poland
Monastery of Santa María la Real in Aguilar de Campoo, Aguilar de Campoo, Spain
Santa María de La Vid, La Vid y Barrios, Burgos (currently Augustinian), Spain
Bellelay Abbey (Abbaye de Bellelay), Bellelay, Switzerland
Gottstatt Abbey, Orpund, Switzerland
Romainmôtier Abbey, Romainmôtier-Envy, Switzerland
Rüti Abbey (Kloster Rüti) and Rüti Church, Switzerland

Alnwick Abbey, England
Barlings Abbey, England
Bayham Abbey, England
Beauchief Abbey, England
Beeleigh Abbey, England
Blanchland Abbey, England
Cockersand Abbey, England
Coverham Abbey, England
Croxton Abbey, England
Dale Abbey, England
Durford Abbey, England
Easby Abbey, England
Egglestone Abbey, England
Hagnaby Abbey, England
Halesowen Abbey, England
Langley Abbey, England
Lavendon Abbey, England
Leiston Abbey, England
Newbo Abbey, England
Newsham Abbey, England
Our Lady of England Priory, England
St. Radegund's Abbey, England
Shap Abbey, England
Sulby Abbey, England
Titchfield Abbey, England
Torre Abbey, England
Tupholme Abbey, England
Welbeck Abbey, England
Wendling Abbey, England
West Langdon Abbey, England
Dercongal Abbey, Scotland
Dryburgh Abbey, Scotland
Fearn Abbey, Scotland
Soulseat Abbey, Scotland
Tongland Abbey, Scotland
Whithorn Priory, Scotland
Talley Abbey ('Abaty Talyllychau'), Wales

Notable members
Robert John Cornell (1919–2009), Democratic U.S. Congressman from Wisconsin from 1975 to 1979 and professor of political science at St. Norbert College
Prokop Diviš (1698–1765), Czech inventor
Jan Druys (1568-1635), Flemish canon regular and abbot
Juan de Galavís (1683–1739), Spanish archbishop in Latin America
Charles-Hyacinthe Hugo (1667–1739), French historian and bishop
Hermann Joseph (1150?–1241), German canon regular and mystic
Johann Lohel (1549–1622), Bohemian prior who later became archbishop of Prague
Werenfried van Straaten (1913–2003), Dutch priest and activist, known for his humanitarian work, particularly as founder of the international Catholic association Aid to the Church in Need
Francis Wichmans (1596–1661), Belgian abbot, scholar, and noted theologian of his day
Johann Zahn (1631–1707), German canon who wrote on the camera obscura and who invented an early camera

Norbertine Saints
Hermann Joseph von Steinfeld (feast May 24)
Norbert (+1134, f. Jun. 6) 
Adrian and James of Middleburg, martyrs (+1572, f Jul. 9)
Evermode of Ratzeburg (+1178, f. Feb. 17)
Frederick of Hallum (or of Mariengaarde) (+1175, f. Feb. 4) 
Gilbert of Neuffontaines (or of Cappenberg) (+1152, f. Oct. 26)
Godfrey of Cappenberg (+1127, f. Jan. 14)
Isfrid (Isfried) of Ratzeburg (+1204, f. Jun. 15), 
Ludolph of Ratzeburg (+1250, f. April 16)
Siard of Mariengaarde (+1230, f. Nov. 14).

Norbertine Blesseds include Beatrice of Engelport (+1275, f. Mar. 12/13) Bronislava of Poland (or of Zwierzniec) (+1259, f. Aug. 30), Gerlach of Valkenburg (+1172, Jan. 5), Gertrude of Aldenberg (Altenburg), Abbess (+1297, f. Aug. 13), Hugh of Fosse (+1164, f. Feb. 10), Hroznata of Teplá (+1217, f. Jul. 14), Jakob Kern of Geras (+1924, f. Oct. 20), Oda of Bonne Rivreuille (+1158, f. Apr. 20), Peter-Adrian Toulorge of Blanchelande, Martyr (+1793, f. Oct. 13), and Ricvera of Clastres (+1136, f. Oct. 29).

Norbertines celebrate "all Norbertine Saints and Blesseds" on Nov. 13.

Education

St. Norbert College in De Pere, Wisconsin, United States, is the only institution of higher education sponsored by the Order. Elsewhere they also sponsor/operate schools or serve in pastoral care capacities at parish schools.

Schools founded or sponsored by the order include:
Abbot Pennings High School, De Pere, Wisconsin, US (merged to form Notre Dame Academy)
Archmere Academy, Claymont, Delaware, US
Cardinal Gracias High School, Bandra, Maharashtra, India
St. Michael's Preparatory School, Silverado, California, US
St. Norbert College, Perth, Western Australia
Saint Norbert Gymnasium (hu), Gödöllő, Hungary

Controversies
Northern Ireland's Historical Abuse Inquiry investigated reports that Brendan Smyth, a member of the Norbertine Order, was allowed to continue paedophilia for more than four decades, even after Smyth himself had admitted in 1994, the same year that he was jailed for his crimes, that "Over the years of religious life it could be that I have sexually abused between 50 and 100 children. That number could even be doubled or perhaps even more." Reviewers of the case agree that there was a deliberate plot to conceal Smyth's behaviour, incompetence by his superiors at Kilnacrott Abbey.

See also
List of Premonstratensian monasteries in France
:Category:Premonstratensian monasteries in England

References
Notes

Bibliography

Wolfgang Grassl, Culture of Place: An Intellectual Profile of the Premonstratensian Order. Nordhausen: Bautz, 2012.

External links

Premonstratensian Home Page
St Norbert College, Catholic Secondary School in the Norbertine Tradition)
St. Norbert College - Private Catholic College (Norbertine Tradition)
Archmere Academy - Catholic School in the Norbertine Tradition
Archmere Alumni Association
The website for St. Michael's Abbey of the Norbertine Fathers in Silverado, California
The website of the Norbertine Community of Our Lady of England Priory, Storrington, West Sussex, UK
Norbertines of Chelmsford, UK
Center for Norbertine Studies, St. Norbert College, De Pere, Wisconsin

 

1120 establishments in Europe
Religious organizations established in the 1120s
Christian religious orders established in the 12th century